Payn is a surname. Notable people with the surname include:

Graham Payn (1918–2005), South African-born English actor and singer
John Payn (disambiguation), multiple people
James Payn (1830–1898), British novelist
Richard Payn, MP for Shaftesbury (UK Parliament constituency)